Pleasant Gap Township is one of twenty-four townships in Bates County, Missouri, and is part of the Kansas City metropolitan area within the USA.  As of the 2000 census, its population was 264.

The township took its name from the community of Pleasant Gap, Missouri.

Geography
According to the United States Census Bureau, Pleasant Gap Township covers an area of 45.64 square miles (118.22 square kilometers); of this, 45.61 square miles (118.12 square kilometers, 99.92 percent) is land and 0.04 square miles (0.1 square kilometers, 0.08 percent) is water.

Unincorporated towns
 Pleasant Gap at 
(This list is based on USGS data and may include former settlements.)

Adjacent townships
 Summit Township (north)
 Deepwater Township (northeast)
 Hudson Township (east)
 Rockville Township (southeast)
 Prairie Township (south)
 Lone Oak Township (west)

Cemeteries
The township contains Rogers Cemetery.

Major highways
  Missouri Route 52

Airports and landing strips
 Bauer PGI Airport

School districts
 Butler R-V School District
 Rich Hill R-IV

Political districts
 Missouri's 4th congressional district
 State House District 120
 State House District 125
 State Senate District 31

References
 United States Census Bureau 2008 TIGER/Line Shapefiles
 United States Board on Geographic Names (GNIS)
 United States National Atlas

External links
 US-Counties.com
 City-Data.com

Townships in Bates County, Missouri
Townships in Missouri